The Paper and Watermark Museum is a museum of Fabriano, Italy. Based on the paper-making tradition of Fabriano, which is documented since the 12th Century, the museum focusses on handmade paper and watermark techniques in Medieval Italy.

Description
The Fabrianese papermakers probably learned the techniques from the Arabs, and were able to sufficiently refine and perfect the process for their paper to successfully compete with parchment.  

The Fabrianese papermakers also developed different types of multiple hammer mills used to grind the rag cloth, and a method of sizing paper by means of animal glue.

The introduction of watermarks in Fabriano was related to applying metal wires on a cover laid against the mould used for forming the paper.

In addition to the permanent collections, which present the development of the paper manufacturing industry, the museum gives practical demonstrations, as well as educational courses and workshops (how to make paper using ancient manufacturing techniques, understanding the chemical peculiarities of lithographic printing, inking and printing with an original press, etc.).

See also
 Cartiere Miliani Fabriano
 Archivio storico delle Cartiere Miliani Fabriano

References

External links
Museo della carta - Official Website

Museums in Marche
Fabriano
Industry museums in Italy
Papermaking museums